The Society for French Historical Studies (SFHS) is, along with the Western Society for French History (WSFH), one of the two primary historical societies devoted to the study of French history headquartered in the United States.

The SFHS edits the journal French Historical Studies and holds an annual conference.  SFHS is affiliated with the academic discussion forum H-France.

The SFHS was informally formed under the leadership of Evelyn Acomb in 1954, holding its first conference in April, 1955 in Ithaca, New York.  The first issue of French Historical Studies was published in 1958 with Marvin L. Brown of the University of North Carolina at Chapel Hill serving as its first editor.

External links
 SFHS Homepage

1955 establishments in the United States
Historical societies of the United States